The Virginian may refer to:

Literature
 The Virginian (novel), a 1902 novel by American author Owen Wister
 The Virginians: A Tale of the Last Century, an 1857-1859 novel by William Makepeace Thackeray

Theatre
 The Virginian, a 1903 stage play, based on the Wister novel

Film
 The Virginian (1914 film), a silent film directed by Cecil B. DeMille and starring Dustin Farnum, based on the Wister novel
 The Virginian (1923 film), a silent film directed by Tom Forman and starring Kenneth Harlan, based on the Wister novel
 The Virginian (1929 film), directed by Victor Fleming and starring Gary Cooper, based on the Wister novel
 The Virginian (1946 film), directed by Stuart Gilmore and starring Joel McCrea, based on the Wister novel
 The Virginian (2014 film), starring Trace Adkins and Ron Perlman, a Canadian straight-to-video release, based on the Wister novel.

Television
 The Virginian (TV series), American television series (1962–1971) loosely based on the Wister novel; renamed The Men from Shiloh in its final season
 The Virginian, a 2000 TV film directed by and starring Bill Pullman, based on the Wister novel

Music
 The Virginian (album), an album by Neko Case and Her Boyfriends

See also
 
 Virginian (disambiguation)